Bahati may refer to:

Places 
Bahati, Nairobi, an estate of Nairobi, the capital of Kenya

People 
Bahati Ali Abeid, Tanzanian politician
David Bahati, Ugandan politician
Olivier Bahati, Burundian footballer
Rahsaan Bahati, American cyclist